The Apostolic Nunciature to Kyrgyzstan is an ecclesiastical office of the Catholic Church in Kyrgyzstan. It is a diplomatic post of the Holy See, whose representative is called the Apostolic Nuncio with the rank of an ambassador.

The nuncio resides in Kazakhstan.

List of papal representatives to Kyrgyzstan 
Apostolic Nuncios 
Marian Oleś (9 April 1994 – 11 December 2001)
Józef Wesołowski (6 July 2002 – 24 January 2008)
Miguel Maury Buendía (12 July 2008 – 5 December 2015)
Francis Assisi Chullikatt (24 June 2016 – 01 October 2022)

References

Kyrgyzstan
 
Holy See–Kyrgyzstan relations